The 2021–22 season was Exeter City's 120th year in their history, and their tenth and final consecutive season in League Two. After finishing second in the League Two table, the club achieved promotion to League One for the 2022–23 season. Along with the league, the club also competed in the FA Cup, the EFL Cup and the EFL Trophy. The season covers the period from 1 July 2021 to 30 June 2022.

Pre-season friendlies
Exeter City announced they will play friendlies against Weston-super-Mare, Tiverton Town, Taunton Town, Bath City, Weymouth, Cardiff City, Bristol City, Shrewsbury Town and Truro City as part of their pre-season preparations.

Competitions

League Two

League table

Results summary

Results by matchday

Matches
The Grecians' fixtures were released on 24 June 2021.

FA Cup

Exeter City were drawn away to Bradford City in the first round and to Cambridge United in the second round.

EFL Cup

Exeter were drawn at home to Wycombe Wanderers in the first round.

EFL Trophy

Exeter were drawn into Southern Group E alongside Bristol Rovers, Chelsea U21s and Cheltenham Town.

Transfers

Transfers in

Loans in

Loans out

Transfers out

References

Exeter City
Exeter City F.C. seasons